Dani Suárez (born 7 May 1990) is a Spanish professional footballer who plays as a centre back for Super League Greece club Atromitos.

Career
On 21 June 2019, he joined Asteras Tripolis of the Greek Super League 1 on a free transfer. 

On 14 August 2021, he joined Abha on a one-year deal.

On 15 July 2022, Dani signed a one-year contract with Atromitos with an option for an additional one.

Career statistics

References

External links

1990 births
Living people
Spanish footballers
Association football central defenders
Real Madrid C footballers
Real Madrid Castilla footballers
SD Ponferradina players
Górnik Zabrze players
Asteras Tripolis F.C. players
Atromitos F.C. players
Abha Club players
Tercera División players
Segunda División B players
Ekstraklasa players
Super League Greece players
Saudi Professional League players
Spanish expatriate footballers
Expatriate footballers in Poland
Expatriate footballers in Greece
Expatriate footballers in Saudi Arabia
Spanish expatriate sportspeople in Poland
Spanish expatriate sportspeople in Saudi Arabia
Spanish expatriate sportspeople in Greece
People from Aranjuez